() was a Chinese military rank that corresponds to a marshal in other nations. It was given to distinguished generals during China's dynastic and republican periods. A higher level rank of Dayuanshuai, which corresponds to generalissimo was awarded to Chiang Kai Shek of the Republic of China. It was also proposed for Mao Zedong on the mainland, but he ultimately never accepted it.

Song dynasty

Jin dynasty

Republic of China

People's Republic of China 
The rank Marshal of the People's Republic of China was awarded to ten veteran generals of the People's Liberation Army Ground Force in 1955. However, it was abolished in 1965 and was never restored. Five important criteria must be met to attain the rank of Marshal:
 The candidate must have played a leading role in the establishment of one or more Revolutionary base areas;
 Been a Corps Commander, equivalent or above in the Chinese Red Army;
 Been a Divisional Commander, equivalent or above in the Eighth Route Army or a commander of the New Fourth Army;
 A Field Army Commander, Area Army commander or equivalent in the Chinese Communist Revolution;
 Been at least a National Defence Commission Deputy Commissioner prior to receiving the rank.

In addition, Chairman Mao, upon refusing the rank of Dayuanshuai, decreed that cadres who no longer serve in the PLA should lose eligibility for military ranks. Thus, Deng Xiaoping, Liu Shaoqi and Zhou Enlai declined the rank upon offer. Chen Yi also initially refused the rank in accordance to Mao's decree since he now primarily worked in government rather than the PLA. However, Zhou Enlai insisted he took it, citing that because all of the other nine Marshals came from the Eighth Route Army, if he didn't take the rank, there would be nobody of the Marshal rank to represent the legacy of the New Fourth Army, whilst simultaneously citing Nikolai Bulganin who held the rank of Marshal of the Soviet Union whilst working primarily in government as precedence. Thus, he was given an exception and was awarded the rank. As a result, the recipients of the rank were:

Su Yu was left out but he became the most senior of the ten Da Jiang. Many were surprised at this decision but he did not meet the first and second criterion. Seven of the ten Marshals took part in the Nanchang Uprising in various capacities with Zhou Enlai. Of the other three, Peng Dehuai led the Pingjiang Uprising. The other was Luo Ronghuan, who instead assisted Mao Tse-tung in the Autumn Harvest Uprising. Lin Biao was the youngest and Zhu De was the oldest of the ten Marshals aged 48 and 69 respectively at time of conferment. Luo Ronghuan was the first to die at age 61 in 1963 and Nie Rongzhen was the last to die aged 93 in 1992. Four of the ten Marshals were addressed by their honorific of 老总 (Lao Zong, or "Old Chief") by Chairman Mao himself due to their seniority and long service. These were Zhu De, Peng Dehuai, He Long and Chen Yi. Nie Rongzhen was sometimes also addressed as Lao Zong but not by Chairman Mao personally. One, Lin Biao, was simply addressed as 总 Zong due to his battle honours. He was not addressed as Lao Zong due to his youth and lesser seniority. He was also the only Marshal not to have deceased in Beijing.

See also 
 Marshal of the Soviet Union
 Other pronunciations of the Chinese characters 元帥
 Gensui, the Japanese equivalent
 Wonsu, the Korean equivalent
 Nguyên soái, the Vietnamese equivalent
 Grand yuanshuai (大元帥), a rank higher than yuanshuai
 Dayuanshuai in Chinese
 Dai-gensui, the Japanese equivalent
 Taewonsu, the Korean equivalent
 Đại nguyên soái, the Vietnamese equivalent

References

External links 
 

Yuanshuai
 
Military ranks of the People's Republic of China
Military history of China